John Blair Vornholt (born February 14, 1951) is an American author, screenwriter and journalist.

As an author, he has written numerous media tie-ins, including many Star Trek novels.  As a screenwriter, he worked on several animated children's series of the 1980s, including Ghostbusters, Dennis the Menace and Beverly Hills Teens.  As a journalist, he has worked as lead writer for The Hollywood Reporter and Tucson Weekly.

Bibliography

Original works
The Troll King
The Troll Queen
The Troll Treasure
The First Third (play)
How To Sneak Into The Girls’ Locker Room

Babylon 5
Book One Voices
Book Three Blood Oath

Buffy and Angel
Coyote Moon
Seven Crows

Dinotopia
Riverquest
Sabertooth Mountain
Dolphin Watch

Final Fantasy
Final Fantasy: The Spirits Within (YA version)

Flight 29 Down
The Seven
The Return

Marvel
Spider-Man: Valley Of The Lizard

Primal Rage
The Avatars

Star Trek
Masks 
Contamination
Sanctuary 
War Drums 
Star Trek Generations 
Capture the Flag
Antimatter 
Rogue Saucer
Aftershock
Crossfire 
Star Trek: First Contact 
Mind Meld 
Behind Enemy Lines 
 Tunnel Through the Stars
Star Trek: Insurrection 
Quarantine 
Gemworld, Book One
Gemworld, Book Two
The Captain and the King 
The Genesis Wave series
Star Trek: Nemesis
Genesis Force 
A Time to Be Born 
A Time to Die

Filmography
1986 - Ghostbusters
1986 - Dennis the Menace
1987 - Beverly Hills Teens
1987 - Dinosaucers
1987 - Sylvanian Families
1988 - A Whole Lotta Fun
1990 - The Adventures of Super Mario Bros. 3
1990 - The New Adventures of He-Man

References

External links
 
 

1951 births
Living people
20th-century American novelists
21st-century American novelists
People from Marion, Ohio
Novelists from Ohio
American male novelists
American television writers
American male screenwriters
American male television writers
20th-century American male writers
21st-century American male writers
Screenwriters from Ohio